Sperm-associated antigen 6 is a protein that in humans is encoded by the SPAG6 gene.

Function 

The correlation of anti-sperm antibodies with cases of unexplained infertility implicates a role for these antibodies in blocking fertilization. Improved diagnosis and treatment of immunologic infertility, as well as identification of proteins for targeted contraception, are dependent on the identification and characterization of relevant sperm antigens. The protein expressed by this gene is recognized by anti-sperm antibodies from an infertile man. This protein localizes to the tail of permeabilized human sperm and contains eight contiguous armadillo repeats, a motif known to mediate protein-protein interactions. Studies in mice suggest that this protein is involved in sperm flagellar motility and maintenance of the structural integrity of mature sperm. Alternatively spliced variants that encode different protein isoforms have been described but the full-length sequences of only two have been determined.

References

Further reading 

 
 
 
 
 
 
 
 
 
 

Armadillo-repeat-containing proteins